Ahmed Farah Ali also known as Idaajaa, is a Somali literary scholar and publisher of written folklore. He was born into a Mareexaan family.

Career
Ali was a political analyst, and directed the program Fanka iyo Suugaanta on the BBC Somali section.

He is also the editor of the work of several poets. The collection of Ismaciil Mire's poems was introduced, annotated and written down by Ali while at the Academy of Culture in Mogadishu in 1974.

Ali currently hosts a weekly radio segment on VOA Somali titled Dhaqanka iyo Hiddaha, meaning "Culture and Heritage".

References

External links

Somalian writers
Somalian non-fiction writers
1948 births
Living people
Somali-language writers